Chaetoprocta is a genus of butterflies in the family Lycaenidae.

Species
Listed alphabetically:
Chaetoprocta baileyi Forster, 1980 Nepal
Chaetoprocta kurumi Fujioka, 1970 Nepal
Chaetoprocta odata (Hewitson, 1865)

References

Theclini
Lycaenidae genera
Taxa named by Lionel de Nicéville